Theater in der Basilika is a theatre in Hamburg, Germany.

Theatres in Hamburg
Buildings and structures in Altona, Hamburg